Barbara Stock (born May 26, 1956) is an American former actress, best known for roles as Susan Silverman in ABC crime drama series Spenser: For Hire (1985–1988), and as Liz Adams in CBS primetime soap opera Dallas (1990–1991); she also appeared in the role of Heather Wilson in two episodes in season five of the series.

Life and career
Stock was born in Downers Grove, Illinois, and began acting professionally in 1978. Beforehand, she hosted the local talk show "Mid-Morning" on WTTV (now CBS4) Indianapolis from their facilities in Bloomington.  She played the role of Claudia in the Tommy Tune-directed, Tony Award-winning musical Nine on Broadway, replacing Shelley Burch in the original cast in 1983. She is best known for having appeared in the prime-time drama Spenser: For Hire for two non-consecutive seasons (1985–1986; 1987–1988) as Susan Silverman, the love interest of Spenser (Robert Urich).

Stock starred in the final season of CBS primetime soap opera Dallas from 1990 to 1991 as Liz Adams, the fiancée of Cliff Barnes (Ken Kercheval). She later starred in the ABC primetime soap opera miniseries Trade Winds as Grace Sommers. She also appeared in "The Subway," an episode of Seinfeld, where she enticed George Costanza (Jason Alexander) off a subway, brought him to a hotel, then handcuffed him to a bed and robbed him of eight dollars and all of his clothes. In 1997, Stock had a recurring role on the now-defunct ABC daytime soap opera Port Charles as Nicole Devlin.

Stock appeared in more than 100 hours of television and made over 30 guest appearances on television shows, including CHiPs, The Facts of Life, Fantasy Island, Remington Steele, Knight Rider, The A-Team , Moonlighting, Murder, She Wrote, The Twilight Zone, MacGyver, Touched by an Angel, and Charmed. Her final screen appearance was in the 2001 television film The Princess & the Marine, alongside Mark-Paul Gosselaar.

After she gave up acting, Stock started an interior design firm whose clientele were generally located in Los Angeles and the San Fernando Valley.

Filmography

References

External links
 

1956 births
Actresses from Illinois
American television actresses
Living people
American soap opera actresses
20th-century American actresses
American interior designers
21st-century American women